"Give Me Five!" is the 25th single by the Japanese girl idol group AKB48. It is also AKB48's fifth sakura-themed single, and their first single of 2012. This single was released in Japan on February 15, 2012.

Give Me Five! is AKB48's fifth sakura-themed single. However, unlike the previous ones, this single's title doesn't contain the word sakura.

The music video for the song Give Me Five! is a 34-minute Japanese television drama-like style video. This video was directed by Shigemichi Sugita, and it stars AKB48 members Atsuko Maeda, Yuko Oshima, Yuki Kashiwagi, Minami Takahashi. Actor Takanori Jinnai also stars in the music video.

Give Me Five sold approximately 967,000 copies on its debut day, thus making it AKB48's 12th single to achieve No.1 on the Oricon charts.

Production

Give Me Five!
Give Me Five! was sung by a band called Baby Blossom comprising 18 selected members from AKB48 and its sister groups SKE48 and NMB48. The band is led by Atsuko Maeda, who is playing the rhythm guitar, and Yuko Oshima, who is playing a bass guitar. Other members of the band include Minami Takahashi, who is playing the lead guitar, Yuki Kashiwagi, who is in charge of the drums, Mayu Watanabe, who is playing the keyboard, Haruna Kojima, who is on the synthesizer, Rino Sashihara and Minami Minegishi, who are playing the trombones, Rena Matsui and Yui Yokoyama, who are playing the trumpets, Jurina Matsui, who is playing the standing drums, Mariko Shinoda, who plays the tambourine, and Tomomi Itano, who is playing the shaker. Sae Miyazawa, Rie Kitahara, Aki Takajō, Tomomi Kasai and Sayaka Yamamoto are the band's chorus.

This band was formed in secret by AKB48's producer Yasushi Akimoto on 28 August 2011. During the five months prior to the official revelation of the band, the 18 members trained in secret in between their performance schedules. Members of the rock band Gacharic Spin were some of their coaches. Out of the 18 band members, only three had previously played the  musical instrument they are playing this time (some of them have played other instruments). They are Yuko Oshima, who played the bass guitar during her high school days, Rena Matsui and Rino Sashihara, who had previously played the trumpet and trombone respectively. Baby Blossom was officially revealed to the public during the 4th and last day of concert AKB48 Request Hour Set List Best 100 2012, held on January 22, 2012. At the event, the members performed the song Give Me Five! for the first time.

Music video
The music video was directed by director Shigemichi Sugita. The music video stars AKB48 members Atsuko Maeda, Yuko Oshima, Yuki Kashiwagi, Minami Takahashi and actor Takanori Jinnai. The filming of this music video took place in a high school located in Saitama Prefecture during end-November 2011.

This music video tells the story of four students, all of whom comes from troubled backgrounds. Atsuko Maeda plays the role of Atsuko Ogata, a girl whose parents divorced and subsequently went to Tokyo. Yuko Oshima plays Yuko Osawa, a girl who secretly works at a brothel to cover household expenses. Yuki Kashiwagi stars as Yuki Kobayashi, a girl who is mentally troubled after being bullied at school. Minami Takahashi plays the role of Minami Ichikawa, a quick-tempered girl who can never stay in one job for long. Takanori Jinnai stars as the quartet's homeroom teacher. The four of them, on the suggestion of their teacher, formed a music band named Baby Blossom. Together, they mature and gradually become self-confident.Ryosuke Miura as Ankh and Shu Watanabe as Eji Hino from Kamen Rider OOO made a cameo.

The music video is included in both the Type-A and Type-B versions of this single.
It was made available for viewing on the group's official YouTube channel on May 22 .

Announcement
Some information on this single was announced on December 12, 2011. However, the title of the single was not revealed in that announcement. The title was later published at the King Records official site on January 2, 2012. On January 22, 2012, AKB48 performed the title song in concert for the first time, during the group's Request Hour Set List Best 100 2012 concert held at Tokyo Dome City Hall. During that performance, it was unveiled that the title track of this single, Give Me Five!, will be performed by a specially-formed band named Baby Blossom. The band comprises selected members who played different musical instruments.

Release details
Give Me Five! was officially released in Japan on February 15, 2012.

The single is available in 5 versions: Type-A Regular and Limited Editions, Type-B Regular and Limited, and Theater Edition.

All regular editions are CD+DVD. They come sealed and include a bonus: the limited editions have a randomly seeded ticket for 1 of 2 nationwide handshake events, and the regular editions have 1 randomly seeded photo of a member out of the 18-photo set created exclusively for the single.

The Theater Edition is CD only. It comes with a ticket for a large release event at AKB48 Theater. Plus, since the edition is intended for being sold at AKB48 Theater, the buyer can in person pick 1 member photo out of a large photoset created especially for the theater edition of the single.

In total, the single sold 967,000 copies on the first day of their release.

Reception
Give Me Five! sold approximately 967,000 copies on its debut day. This makes it the AKB48's third-highest selling single on its release day, behind singles Kaze wa Fuiteiru (which sold 1.046 million copies on its release day) and Flying Get (which sold 1.026 million copies on its release day).

In total, Give Me Five! sold 1.287 million copies on its debut week. This makes it AKB48's 12th single that topped the Oricon charts, and its 6th consecutive million-selling single.

Track listing

Type A

Type B

Theater Version

Bonus

Types A, B 
 (Limited Edition) Random national handshake event ticket (sealed in, 2 kinds in total available)
 (Regular Edition) Random photo of a member (sealed in, one per senbatsu member, i.e. 18 kinds in total, available)

Theater Edition 
 Large handshake event ticket
 Photo of a member (selectable from a set, one kind per member available)

Members

"Give Me Five!" 
Center: Atsuko Maeda
 Team A: Haruna Kojima, Rino Sashihara, Mariko Shinoda, Aki Takajō, Minami Takahashi, Atsuko Maeda
 Team K: Tomomi Itano, Yūko Ōshima, Minami Minegishi, Sae Miyazawa, Yui Yokoyama
 Team B: Tomomi Kasai, Yuki Kashiwagi, Rie Kitahara, Mayu Watanabe
 SKE48 Team S: Jurina Matsui, Rena Matsui
 NMB48 Team N: Sayaka Yamamoto

Note: The selected members are the same as on "Kaze wa Fuiteiru".

"Sweet & Bitter" 
Sung by :
Center: Minami Takahashi, Atsuko Maeda
 Team A: Rino Sashihara, Mariko Shinoda, Minami Takahashi, Atsuko Maeda
 Team K: Tomomi Itano, Yūko Ōshima

"New Ship" 
Sung by :
Center: Jurina Matsui, Melody Nurramdhani Laksani
 Team B: Sumire Satō
 Team 4: Miori Ichikawa, Anna Iriyama, Haruka Shimazaki, Suzuran Yamauchi
 Kenkyūsei: Karen Iwata, Rena Katō, Rina Kawaei, Juri Takahashi, Yuka Tano
 SKE48 Team S: Yuria Kizaki, Jurina Matsui
 SKE48 Team E: Kanon Kimoto
 NMB48 Team N: Miyuki Watanabe
 HKT48 (then Kenkyūsei): Haruka Kodama
 JKT48 (then Kenkyūsei): Melody Nurramdhani Laksani

"Hitsujikai no Tabi" 
Sung by :
Center: Yuki Kashiwagi, Mayu Watanabe
 Team A: Misaki Iwasa, Aika Ōta, Haruka Katayama, Asuka Kuramochi, Haruna Kojima, Aki Takajō
 Team K: Sayaka Akimoto, Ayaka Umeda, Ayaka Kikuchi, Reina Fujie, Sakiko Matsui, Minami Minegishi, Sae Miyazawa, Yui Yokoyama
 Team B: Tomomi Kasai, Yuki Kashiwagi, Rie Kitahara, Amina Sato, Yuka Masuda, Mayu Watanabe
 Team 4: Haruka Shimada, Mariya Nagao
 SKE48 Team S: Rena Matsui
 SKE48 Team KII: Akane Takayanagi

"Yungu ya Furoito no Baai" 
Sung by 
 Team A: Shizuka Ōya, Haruka Nakagawa, Chisato Nakata, Sayaka Nakaya, Ami Maeda, Natsumi Matsubara
 Team K: Mayumi Uchida, Miku Tanabe, Tomomi Nakatsuka, Moeno Nitō, Misato Nonaka, Rumi Yonezawa
 Team B: Haruka Ishida, Kana Kobayashi, Mika Komori, Natsuki Satō, Shihori Suzuki, Mariya Suzuki, Rina Chikano, Natsumi Hirajima, Miho Miyazaki
 Team 4: Maria Abe, Miyu Takeuchi, Shiori Nakamata, Mariko Nakamura
 Kenkyūsei: Rina Izuta, Miyū Ōmori, Natsuki Kojima, Marina Kobayashi, Erena Saeed Yokota, Yukari Sasaki, Rika Suzuki, Wakana Natori, Rina Hirata, Nana Fujita, Tomu Muto, Ayaka Morikawa

Charts

Sales and certifications

References

External links 
 Profile at the King Records website 

2012 singles
AKB48 songs
Songs with lyrics by Yasushi Akimoto
Oricon Weekly number-one singles
Billboard Japan Hot 100 number-one singles
RIAJ Digital Track Chart number-one singles
King Records (Japan) singles
2012 songs
Songs about cherry blossom